Murder in Michigan constitutes the intentional killing, under circumstances defined by law, of people within or under the jurisdiction of the U.S. state of Michigan.

In Michigan, a person is found guilty of first-degree murder when murder is perpetrated by means of poison, lying in wait, or any other willful, deliberate, and premeditated killing. In Michigan, the top penalty the perpetrator can receive is life imprisonment.

The United States Centers for Disease Control and Prevention reported that in the year 2020, the state had a murder rate well above the median for the entire country.

Felony murder rule
The felony murder rule was abolished in the state of Michigan by the 1980 decision People v. Aaron.  The court reasoned that the commission of a felony should only be used as a grading factor between first and second degree murder, and not something that could independently make an offense punishable as murder.

Penalties
Source:

See also
 Law of Michigan

References

Michigan law
U.S. state criminal law
Murder in Michigan